The 2021–22 FIS Cross-Country Continental Cup (COC) is a season of the FIS Cross-Country Continental Cup, a series of second-level cross-country skiing competitions arranged by the International Ski Federation (FIS).

The 2021–22 Continental Cup contains nine different series of geographically restricted competitions; five in Europe, two in North America and one each in Asia and Oceania. 

On 1 March 2022, following the 2022 Russian invasion of Ukraine, FIS decided to exclude athletes from Russia and Belarus from FIS competitions, with an immediate effect.

Winners
The overall winners from the 2021–22 season's Continental Cups are rewarded a right to start in the first period in the following 2022–23 World Cup season.

Results

Men

Alpen Cup

Australia/New Zealand Cup

Balkan Cup

Eastern Europe Cup

Far East Cup

Scandinavian Cup

Slavic Cup

US Super Tour

Nor-Am Cup

Women

Alpen Cup

Australia/New Zealand Cup

Balkan Cup

Eastern Europe Cup

Far East Cup

Scandinavian Cup

Slavic Cup

US Super Tour

Nor-Am Cup

References

 
FIS Cross-Country Continental Cup seasons
2021 in cross-country skiing
2022 in cross-country skiing